Razová is a municipality and village in Bruntál District in the Moravian-Silesian Region of the Czech Republic. It has about 500 inhabitants. It lies on the shore of Slezská Harta Reservoir.

History
The first written mention of Razová is from 1288.

Until 1918, Raase was part of the Austrian monarchy (Austria side after the compromise of 1867), in the Freundenthal (Bruntál) district, one of the 8 Bezirkshauptmannschaften in Austrian Silesia.

The municipality had 1,839 inhabitants according to the Austrian census of 1910, German-speaking were 1,830 of them. Most populous religious group were Roman Catholics with 1,829 (99.5%).

References

External links

Villages in Bruntál District